Kuivalainen is a Finnish surname. Notable people with the surname include:

 Kari Kuivalainen (born 1961), Finnish singer-songwriter
 Mateli Magdalena Kuivalatar (née Kuivalainen, 1777–1846), Finnish folk singer
 Pasi Kuivalainen (born 1972), Finnish ice hockey goaltender
 Sandhja Kuivalainen (born 1991), Finnish singer

Finnish-language surnames